Lagraulet may refer to two communes in France:
 Lagraulet-du-Gers, in the Gers department
 Lagraulet-Saint-Nicolas, in the Haute-Garonne department